The Back Door Wolf is the final studio album by blues musician Howlin' Wolf, released by Chess Records in 1973.

Reception

In a retrospective AllMusic review, critic Cub Koda wrote: "This, Wolf's last hurrah, is his final studio album. Cut with his regular working band, the Wolf Gang, everything here works well ... Not the place to start a Wolf collection by any means, but a great place to end up".

Track listing 
All compositions credited to Chester Burnett except where noted
 "Moving" – 2:44
 "Coon on the Moon" (Eddie Shaw) – 3:44
 "Speak Now Woman" (James Oden) – 4:50
 "Trying to Forget You" (Shaw) – 3:33
 "Stop Using Me" – 2:52
 "Leave Here Walking" (Shaw) – 2:30
 "The Back Door Wolf" (Shaw, Ralph Bass) – 4:02
 "You Turn Slick on Me" (Emery Williams Jr.) – 4:50
 "The Watergate Blues" (Shaw) – 3:10
 "Can't Stay Here" (Andrew McMahon) – 2:31
Additional track on CD reissue
"Speak Now Woman" [Alternate take] (Oden) – 4:20

Personnel 
Howlin' Wolf – vocals, harmonica
Eddie Shaw – tenor saxophone (track 7)
Detroit Junior – piano, harpsichord
Hubert Sumlin, Willie Williams – guitar
Andrew "Blueblood" McMahon, James Green – bass
S. P. Leary – drums

References 

1973 albums
Howlin' Wolf albums
Chess Records albums
Albums produced by Ralph Bass